Major General Derek Christopher John Deighton  (21 November 1930 – 16 April 1991) was a senior officer of the Australian Army. He was the brother of Brigadier John Deighton MC.

Early life
Deighton attended Mentone Grammar School, and graduated from the Royal Military College, Duntroon in 1952.

Australian Army
Derek served overseas in Korea during 1953–54, Japan, UK, Germany, and Vietnam (during war 1967–68).

Deighton served as the Chief of Staff Logistics Command 1978–1979 and finally as General Officer Commanding Logistics Command.

As of 2015, Derek is one of three Royal Australian Corps of Transport officers to reach the rank of major general.

References

1930 births
1991 deaths
Australian generals
Australian Members of the Order of the British Empire
Australian military personnel of the Korean War
Australian military personnel of the Vietnam War
Australian public servants
Officers of the Order of Australia
Royal Military College, Duntroon graduates